Grab is a peak in northern Kosovo, on the border with Serbia.

Grab reaches a top height of approx. .

Notes and references

Notes:

References:

Mountains of Kosovo
Borders of Kosovo
Kosovo–Serbia border